The 2009 NORCECA Beach Volleyball Circuit at Puerto Vallarta, was held October 9–11, 2009 in Puerto Vallarta, Mexico. It was the seventh leg of the NORCECA Beach Volleyball Circuit 2009.

Women's competition

Men's competition
Results on October 11, 2009

References

External links
 NORCECA
 BV Info

See also
 NORCECA Beach Volleyball Circuit 2009

Puerto Vallarta
Norceca Beach Volleyball Circuit (Puerto Vallarta), 2009